John R. Whitaker (born 1956) is the head of the United States Department of Agriculture's Farm Service Agency in Iowa, a former Iowa State Representative from the 90th District, and a former assistant House majority leader. He served in the Iowa House of Representatives from 2003 until his July 17, 2009 resignation from the House to accept an appointment to head the USDA's Farm Service Agency in Iowa.  A special election to fill his seat took place on September 1, 2009.

During his last term in the House, Whitaker served on several committees in the Iowa House: the Administration and Rules committee; the Environmental Protection committee; the Natural Resources committee; the Public Safety committee; and the Transportation committee.  His political experience includes serving as Assistant Majority Leader of the Iowa House and serving as Van Buren County Supervisor.

Electoral history
*incumbent

References

External links

 
 Whitaker on Project Vote Smart
 Whitaker's Capitol Web Address

Democratic Party members of the Iowa House of Representatives
Living people
United States Department of Agriculture officials
People from Van Buren County, Iowa
People from Henry County, Iowa
Place of birth missing (living people)
County supervisors in Iowa
1956 births